Pikwitonei Airport  is located adjacent to Pikwitonei, Manitoba, Canada.

References

External links

Certified airports in Manitoba